SM U-103 was an Imperial German Navy Type U 57 U-boat that was rammed and sunk by  during the First World War. U-103 was built by AG Weser in Bremen, launched on 9 June 1917 and commissioned 15 July 1917. She completed five tours of duty under Kptlt. Claus Rücker and sank eight ships totalling  before being lost in the English Channel on 12 May 1918.

Sinking

The crew prepared to launch torpedoes from her stern torpedo tubes but was unable to flood them in time before the submarine was spotted by Olympic, whose gunners opened fire as the transport ship turned to ram.

But there was not enough time before the port propeller of Olympic sliced through the submarine's pressure hull just aft of its conning tower. The crew of U-103 blew ballast tanks before scuttling their sinking submarine. Nine crewmen lost their lives. Olympic did not stop to pick up the survivors but continued on to Cherbourg.  later sighted a distress flare and took 35 survivors to Queenstown.

Wreck
Its deep location makes its largely inaccessible to divers but the wreck was surveyed and identified by a remotely operated underwater vehicle in 2012.

Summary of raiding history

See also
 U-boat Campaign (World War I)

References

Notes

Citations

Bibliography

World War I submarines of Germany
Type U 57 submarines
Ships built in Bremen (state)
1917 ships
U-boats commissioned in 1917
Maritime incidents in 1918
U-boats sunk in 1918
U-boats sunk by British merchant ship
World War I shipwrecks in the English Channel
U-boats sunk in collisions